This list of butterflies of Austria is part of the List of Lepidoptera of Austria.

Butterflies

Hesperiidae
Carcharodus alceae (Esper, 1780)
Carcharodus floccifera (Zeller, 1847)
Carcharodus lavatherae (Esper, 1783)
Carterocephalus palaemon (Pallas, 1771)
Erynnis tages (Linnaeus, 1758)
Hesperia comma (Linnaeus, 1758)
Heteropterus morpheus (Pallas, 1771)
Ochlodes sylvanus (Esper, 1777)
Pyrgus alveus (Hübner, 1803)
Pyrgus andromedae (Wallengren, 1853)
Pyrgus armoricanus (Oberthur, 1910)
Pyrgus cacaliae (Rambur, 1839)
Pyrgus carlinae (Rambur, 1839)
Pyrgus carthami (Hübner, 1813)
Pyrgus cirsii (Rambur, 1839)
Pyrgus malvae (Linnaeus, 1758)
Pyrgus malvoides (Elwes & Edwards, 1897)
Pyrgus onopordi (Rambur, 1839)
Pyrgus serratulae (Rambur, 1839)
Pyrgus warrenensis (Verity, 1928)
Spialia sertorius (Hoffmannsegg, 1804)
Thymelicus acteon (Rottemburg, 1775)
Thymelicus lineola (Ochsenheimer, 1808)
Thymelicus sylvestris (Poda, 1761)

Lycaenidae
Agriades glandon (de Prunner, 1798)
Agriades optilete (Knoch, 1781)
Agriades orbitulus (de Prunner, 1798)
Aricia agestis (Denis & Schiffermuller, 1775)
Aricia artaxerxes (Fabricius, 1793)
Callophrys rubi (Linnaeus, 1758)
Celastrina argiolus (Linnaeus, 1758)
Cupido minimus (Fuessly, 1775)
Cupido osiris (Meigen, 1829)
Cupido argiades (Pallas, 1771)
Cupido decolorata (Staudinger, 1886)
Cyaniris semiargus (Rottemburg, 1775)
Eumedonia eumedon (Esper, 1780)
Favonius quercus (Linnaeus, 1758)
Glaucopsyche alexis (Poda, 1761)
Lampides boeticus (Linnaeus, 1767)
Leptotes pirithous (Linnaeus, 1767)
Lycaena alciphron (Rottemburg, 1775)
Lycaena dispar (Haworth, 1802)
Lycaena helle (Denis & Schiffermuller, 1775)
Lycaena hippothoe (Linnaeus, 1761)
Lycaena phlaeas (Linnaeus, 1761)
Lycaena thersamon (Esper, 1784)
Lycaena tityrus (Poda, 1761)
Lycaena virgaureae (Linnaeus, 1758)
Lysandra bellargus (Rottemburg, 1775)
Lysandra coridon (Poda, 1761)
Phengaris alcon (Denis & Schiffermuller, 1775)
Phengaris arion (Linnaeus, 1758)
Phengaris nausithous (Bergstrasser, 1779)
Phengaris teleius (Bergstrasser, 1779)
Plebejus argus (Linnaeus, 1758)
Plebejus argyrognomon (Bergstrasser, 1779)
Plebejus idas (Linnaeus, 1761)
Polyommatus admetus (Esper, 1783)
Polyommatus damon (Denis & Schiffermuller, 1775)
Polyommatus daphnis (Denis & Schiffermuller, 1775)
Polyommatus amandus (Schneider, 1792)
Polyommatus dorylas (Denis & Schiffermuller, 1775)
Polyommatus eros (Ochsenheimer, 1808)
Polyommatus icarus (Rottemburg, 1775)
Polyommatus thersites (Cantener, 1835)
Pseudophilotes baton (Bergstrasser, 1779)
Pseudophilotes vicrama (Moore, 1865)
Satyrium acaciae (Fabricius, 1787)
Satyrium ilicis (Esper, 1779)
Satyrium pruni (Linnaeus, 1758)
Satyrium spini (Denis & Schiffermuller, 1775)
Satyrium w-album (Knoch, 1782)
Scolitantides orion (Pallas, 1771)
Thecla betulae (Linnaeus, 1758)

Nymphalidae
Aglais io (Linnaeus, 1758)
Aglais urticae (Linnaeus, 1758)
Apatura ilia (Denis & Schiffermuller, 1775)
Apatura iris (Linnaeus, 1758)
Apatura metis Freyer, 1829
Aphantopus hyperantus (Linnaeus, 1758)
Araschnia levana (Linnaeus, 1758)
Arethusana arethusa (Denis & Schiffermuller, 1775)
Argynnis paphia (Linnaeus, 1758)
Argynnis pandora (Denis & Schiffermuller, 1775)
Boloria aquilonaris (Stichel, 1908)
Boloria napaea (Hoffmannsegg, 1804)
Boloria pales (Denis & Schiffermuller, 1775)
Boloria dia (Linnaeus, 1767)
Boloria euphrosyne (Linnaeus, 1758)
Boloria selene (Denis & Schiffermuller, 1775)
Boloria thore (Hübner, 1803)
Boloria titania (Esper, 1793)
Boloria eunomia (Esper, 1799)
Brenthis daphne (Bergstrasser, 1780)
Brenthis hecate (Denis & Schiffermuller, 1775)
Brenthis ino (Rottemburg, 1775)
Brintesia circe (Fabricius, 1775)
Chazara briseis (Linnaeus, 1764)
Coenonympha arcania (Linnaeus, 1761)
Coenonympha gardetta (de Prunner, 1798)
Coenonympha glycerion (Borkhausen, 1788)
Coenonympha hero (Linnaeus, 1761)
Coenonympha oedippus (Fabricius, 1787)
Coenonympha pamphilus (Linnaeus, 1758)
Coenonympha tullia (Muller, 1764)
Erebia aethiops (Esper, 1777)
Erebia alberganus (de Prunner, 1798)
Erebia calcaria Lorkovic, 1953
Erebia cassioides (Reiner & Hochenwarth, 1792)
Erebia claudina (Borkhausen, 1789)
Erebia epiphron (Knoch, 1783)
Erebia eriphyle (Freyer, 1836)
Erebia euryale (Esper, 1805)
Erebia flavofasciata Heyne, 1895
Erebia gorge (Hübner, 1804)
Erebia ligea (Linnaeus, 1758)
Erebia manto (Denis & Schiffermuller, 1775)
Erebia medusa (Denis & Schiffermuller, 1775)
Erebia melampus (Fuessly, 1775)
Erebia meolans (Prunner, 1798)
Erebia mnestra (Hübner, 1804)
Erebia montanus (de Prunner, 1798)
Erebia nivalis Lorkovic & De Lesse, 1954
Erebia oeme (Hübner, 1804)
Erebia pandrose (Borkhausen, 1788)
Erebia pharte (Hübner, 1804)
Erebia pluto (de Prunner, 1798)
Erebia pronoe (Esper, 1780)
Erebia stirius (Godart, 1824)
Erebia styx (Freyer, 1834)
Erebia tyndarus (Esper, 1781)
Euphydryas aurinia (Rottemburg, 1775)
Euphydryas cynthia (Denis & Schiffermuller, 1775)
Euphydryas intermedia (Menetries, 1859)
Euphydryas maturna (Linnaeus, 1758)
Fabriciana adippe (Denis & Schiffermuller, 1775)
Fabriciana niobe (Linnaeus, 1758)
Hipparchia fagi (Scopoli, 1763)
Hipparchia hermione (Linnaeus, 1764)
Hipparchia statilinus (Hufnagel, 1766)
Hipparchia semele (Linnaeus, 1758)
Hyponephele lycaon (Rottemburg, 1775)
Issoria lathonia (Linnaeus, 1758)
Lasiommata maera (Linnaeus, 1758)
Lasiommata megera (Linnaeus, 1767)
Lasiommata petropolitana (Fabricius, 1787)
Libythea celtis (Laicharting, 1782)
Limenitis camilla (Linnaeus, 1764)
Limenitis populi (Linnaeus, 1758)
Limenitis reducta Staudinger, 1901
Lopinga achine (Scopoli, 1763)
Maniola jurtina (Linnaeus, 1758)
Melanargia galathea (Linnaeus, 1758)
Melitaea asteria Freyer, 1828
Melitaea athalia (Rottemburg, 1775)
Melitaea aurelia Nickerl, 1850
Melitaea britomartis Assmann, 1847
Melitaea cinxia (Linnaeus, 1758)
Melitaea diamina (Lang, 1789)
Melitaea didyma (Esper, 1778)
Melitaea parthenoides Keferstein, 1851
Melitaea phoebe (Denis & Schiffermuller, 1775)
Melitaea trivia (Denis & Schiffermuller, 1775)
Melitaea varia Meyer-Dur, 1851
Minois dryas (Scopoli, 1763)
Neptis rivularis (Scopoli, 1763)
Neptis sappho (Pallas, 1771)
Nymphalis antiopa (Linnaeus, 1758)
Nymphalis polychloros (Linnaeus, 1758)
Nymphalis vaualbum (Denis & Schiffermuller, 1775)
Nymphalis xanthomelas (Esper, 1781)
Oeneis glacialis (Moll, 1783)
Pararge aegeria (Linnaeus, 1758)
Polygonia c-album (Linnaeus, 1758)
Satyrus ferula (Fabricius, 1793)
Speyeria aglaja (Linnaeus, 1758)
Vanessa atalanta (Linnaeus, 1758)
Vanessa cardui (Linnaeus, 1758)

Papilionidae
Iphiclides podalirius (Linnaeus, 1758)
Papilio machaon Linnaeus, 1758
Parnassius apollo (Linnaeus, 1758)
Parnassius mnemosyne (Linnaeus, 1758)
Parnassius phoebus (Fabricius, 1793)
Zerynthia polyxena (Denis & Schiffermuller, 1775)

Pieridae
Anthocharis cardamines (Linnaeus, 1758)
Aporia crataegi (Linnaeus, 1758)
Colias alfacariensis Ribbe, 1905
Colias chrysotheme (Esper, 1781)
Colias croceus (Fourcroy, 1785)
Colias erate (Esper, 1805)
Colias hyale (Linnaeus, 1758)
Colias myrmidone (Esper, 1781)
Colias palaeno (Linnaeus, 1761)
Colias phicomone (Esper, 1780)
Gonepteryx rhamni (Linnaeus, 1758)
Leptidea morsei (Fenton, 1882)
Leptidea sinapis (Linnaeus, 1758)
Pieris brassicae (Linnaeus, 1758)
Pieris bryoniae (Hübner, 1806)
Pieris ergane (Geyer, 1828)
Pieris mannii (Mayer, 1851)
Pieris napi (Linnaeus, 1758)
Pieris rapae (Linnaeus, 1758)
Pontia callidice (Hübner, 1800)
Pontia edusa (Fabricius, 1777)

Riodinidae
Hamearis lucina (Linnaeus, 1758)

External links
Fauna Europaea

Austria
Butterflies
Austria
Austria, butterflies